Basement are an English rock band formed in 2009 in Ipswich, Suffolk, England. Their first studio album, I Wish I Could Stay Here, was released in 2011. The next year, Colourmeinkindness was released, charting on the Billboard Top 200.

After touring in support of Colourmeinkindness, the band went on hiatus in 2012. In 2014, they reunited to release the EP Further Sky. The next album, Promise Everything, charted in 2016 in Australia, the UK and the US. The band's fourth album, Beside Myself, was released in October 2018.

History
Basement formed in September 2009 in Ipswich, England, following the break-up of pop punk band In This for Fun. In This for Fun released The Away from Home EP before they broke-up. The band picked Basement as a name simply because they "wanted a short name that didn't mean much." On 17 May 2010, the band released their debut EP Songs About the Weather and in August, signed to Run for Cover.

They released their first full-length album, I Wish I Could Stay Here, through Run For Cover Records in 2011. The band promoted the release through several tours, including tours to Australia and two American tours with label mates and friends from Daylight (now Superheaven).

Before the release of their second album Colourmeinkindness, the band announced a hiatus. The group revealed that the break was "due to a number of personal commitments". Colourmeinkindness was released on 23 October and charted at number 188 on the US Billboard 200 chart. In mid-November, the band played their final shows. Guitarist Alex Henery later revealed it was due to vocalist Andrew Fisher wishing to become a certified teacher. This required Fisher to return to school for a period of a year and a half. Drummer James Fisher, Andrew's younger brother, was graduating from Kingston University, and the rest of the members were working on their respective careers. Henery, meanwhile, was working as a videographer in Boston, Massachusetts for Run for Cover.

On 29 January 2014 a tweet was posted on the band's Twitter account simply saying "Hi", and the dates "2008–2012" were removed from their Twitter and Facebook biographies, suggesting the band had returned from their hiatus. The band posted on Facebook later that day confirming that the hiatus was over as well as suggesting that there would be a summer tour.

In June 2014, the band announced that they had recorded a new EP for release in July of that year, entitled Further Sky including two new songs, plus a cover of Suede's "Animal Nitrate". The band toured across Australia, Japan and America between 26 July and 20 August. For the latter, all of the tour dates had sold out. The band then played a trio of shows (London, Leeds and Manchester) in the UK in late October with support from Cloakroom and Newmoon.

Guitarist Alex Henery noted in an August 2014 interview with The Aquarian that they were writing material for a new album. On 29 January 2016, the band released Promise Everything. On 3 February 2017, it was announced that the band had signed to major label Fueled by Ramen.

In July 2018, Basement posted a teaser video on their social media accounts which featured footage of them recording in the studio. One week later, the band released a new single entitled "Disconnect." The song is the lead track from their fourth album, Beside Myself, which was released globally on 12 October. A month before the album is set to be released, the band premiered a second single on Highsnobiety entitled "Stigmata". A third single, "Be Here Now" was released on 2 October 2018.

In October 2018, it was announced that the band would support Weezer and Pixies on their spring 2019 tour.

In 2021, it was announced that Basement would play at the second night of Outbreak Fest 2022, the band's first show in three years, celebrating 10 years of Colourmeinkindness and 11 years of I Wish I Could Stay Here. The band played directly before Turnstile.

Musical style
AllMusic biographer Matt Collar described the band's sound as influenced by "melodic hardcore punk". Collar later described the band's sound as noise rock. The band is heavily influenced by early 90s acts such as Sunny Day Real Estate and Nirvana, as well as emo bands the Promise Ring and Braid. On Songs About the Weather, Punknews.org reviewer Brian Shultz compared the band to the likes of Title Fight, Daylight and Bearings. The EP's sound has been described as pop punk. I Wish I Could Stay Here has been described as emo, pop punk and post-hardcore. Colourmeinkindness has been described as emo, grunge, punk rock, rock, and alternative rock. Further Sky has been described as alternative rock and rock. Promise Everything has been described as alternative rock.

Band members
 James Fisher – drums
 Andrew Fisher – lead vocals
 Alex Henery – rhythm guitar, backing vocals
 Ronan Crix – lead guitar
 Duncan Stewart – bass

Discography

Studio albums
 I Wish I Could Stay Here (2011)
 Colourmeinkindness (2012)
 Promise Everything (2016)
 Beside Myself (2018)

References
 Citations

Sources

 

Musical groups established in 2009
Musical groups disestablished in 2012
Musical groups reestablished in 2014
English alternative rock groups
English punk rock groups
Emo revival groups
Musical groups from Suffolk
Musical quintets
Fueled by Ramen artists
Run for Cover Records artists